Huma or HUMA may refer to:

Geography 
 Huma, a village in Samuil Municipality, Razgrad Province, Bulgaria
 Huma, Iran, a village in Lorestan Province, Iran
 Huma County, a county of Daxing'anling Prefecture in Heilongjiang, China
 Huma River (Heilongjiang), a tributary of the Amur River in Heilongjiang, China
 Huma River (Romania), a tributary of the Nemţişor River in Romania

Other uses
 Huma (company), British health technology company
 Canadian House of Commons Standing Committee on Human Resources, Skills and Social Development and the Status of Persons with Disabilities (HUMA)
 Heterogenous Unified Memory Access (hUMA), a cache-coherent shared memory design
 Mbarara Airport (ICAO code), Uganda
 Huma bird, a mythical bird of Iranian legend
 Huma Dragonbane, a character in the Dragonlance world
 Leaning Temple of Huma, a shrine near Sambalpur, India

People with the name
 Huma Abedin, aide to Hillary Clinton
 Meher Baba or Huma, Indian mystic and spiritual master
 Huma Bhabha, sculptor
 Hüma Hatun, mother of Mehmed the Conqueror
 Huma Mulji, Pakistani artist
 Huma Qureshi, Indian film actress
 Huma Qureshi (journalist), British Pakistani journalist
 Hümaşah Sultan (disambiguation)

See also
 Haoma, the Avestan language name of a plant and its divinity  
 Homa (disambiguation), which has several different meanings
 Houma (disambiguation), which has several different meanings